Missile Master was a type of US Army Missile Command military installation for the Cold War Project Nike, each which were a complex of systems and facilities for surface-to-air missile command and control. Each Missile Master had a nuclear bunker (except for the initial Ft Meade site) housing the Martin AN/FSG-1 Antiaircraft Defense System, as well as additional "tactical structures" for "an AN/FPS-33 defense acquisition radar (DAR) or similar radar, two height-finder radars," and identification friend or foe secondary radar (e.g., AN/TPX-19 radar interrogator).

Siting
Missile Master radars were usually at a single area with the nuclear bunker (e.g., co-located with a USAF radar station) such as the  purchased for the Arlington Heights Army Installation. Conversely, the Fort MacArthur Direction Center used radars ~ away at San Pedro Hill AFS.

Nuclear bunker
The Missile Master's two-story fallout-proof & blast-resistant "main building" housed the AN/FSG-1 crew consoles in the "Blue Room" (tiered Antiaircraft Operations Center, AAOC).  Additional rooms in the nuclear bunker included an entrance room with decontamination shower, commander's office; separate rooms for the AN/FSG-1 computer (rows of racks/boxes), storage, ADL, and other system equipment; utility rooms for HVAC and other support systems, and a decontamination water storage room under the AAOC.  "Our radar must be kept above ground.  If that goes, we are out of business anyway" (BGen Robert A. Hewitt), so a less expensive and more vulnerable partially exposed bunker was acceptable for the AN/FSG-1. "Autonomous Operations" allowed remote missile batteries surviving a nuclear strike to launch without AADCP inputs.<ref name=RB1960>{{Cite news|date=June 7, 1960 |title=Base is Dedicated: 'Blue Room' at Missile Master Gives Eerie But Secure Feeling |url=http://209.212.22.88/DATA/RBR/1960-1969/1960/1960.06.07.pdf |location=Red Bank, New Jersey |newspaper=Red Bank Register |pages=1–2 |access-date=2011-09-30 |quote=RADAR SCANNER at Missile Master atop Highlands hills tells the height of aircraft or other flying objects.  It is one of the smaller pieces of radar equipment. …replaces a  operations center at Fort Wadsworth, Staten Island, where Gen.Hewitt's headquarters, the 52d Artillery Brigade Air Defense, also known as "the New York Defense… In addition to the New York area, Missile Master sites are now operational in the Baltimore-Washington area, Seattle and Boston. … A Detroit installation will open this week." |url-status=dead |archive-url=https://web.archive.org/web/20120323151514/http://209.212.22.88/DATA/RBR/1960-1969/1960/1960.06.07.pdf |archive-date=March 23, 2012 }} (photograph caption).</ref>

Construction
Installation of a Missile Master took  approximately 18 months and required an AN/TSQ-8 Fire Unit Integration Facility (FUIF) be installed at each Nike fire unit to provide the ADL interface between the AN/FSG-1 and the fire control system.   The Highlands Army Air Defense Site was completed at an existing SAGE radar station and cost ~$2 million for the new equipment and ~$2 million for the structures:  bunker, power building, and 4 radar towers (a Missile Master at a new radar station was $9 million).  Additional equipment and facilities included tankage for electricity generator fuel, storage for drinking & decontamination water, telephone lines, etc.  In addition to the Martin Company's AN/FSG-1 subcontractors, the Corps of Engineers hired local construction contractors for the facility structures, e.g., Kirkland Construction for Ft Heath and Rust Engineering for the Oakdale Army InstallationThe Pittsburgh Press – Google News Archive Search (the Corps tailored the bunker to each site from the "baseline standard drawings".)  Each Missile Master had 200 total personnel, and maintenance of the AN/FSG-1, the radars, and other systems was provided by an Army "Signal Missile Master Support Detachment" of 10-15 soldiers.  All of the vacuum tube AN/FSG-1 computers were replaced prior to the end of Project Nike.

Closure
Army Air Defense Command Posts (AADCPs) were still at 5 Missile Masters on July 1, 1973 (CA IL MD NJ WA—all with AN/TSQ-51 CCCS except the Ft Lawton BIRDIE) prior to the Army's February 4, 1974, announcement to end Project Nike. The Camp Pedricktown site was designated an historic site in 1998 by the Salem Historic Preservation Office, and documents regarding the Selfridge site have been entered in the Historical American Engineering Record.  In 1999 a romantic comedy set at a midwest US Army missile post was published as a paperback with the name Missile Master'' (the Kansas and Nebraska AADCPs had BIRDIES and never had bunkers.)

References

External links 

1960 establishments in the United States
1960 in military history
1974 disestablishments
1974 in military history
Cold War military installations of the United States
Nuclear bunkers in the United States
Radar networks
Project Nike
United States Army command posts
United States nuclear command and control